Warwick Nicholl was a New Zealand athlete and representative hammer thrower.

In the 1970 British Commonwealth Games he competed in the hammer throw, coming sixth.

In the 1974 British  Commonwealth Games he competed in the hammer throw, coming seventh. He was the flagbearer at the opening ceremony.

References  
 

Possibly living people
Year of birth missing (living people)
New Zealand male hammer throwers
Commonwealth Games competitors for New Zealand
Athletes (track and field) at the 1970 British Commonwealth Games
Athletes (track and field) at the 1974 British Commonwealth Games